The 1995 Cleveland Browns season was the team's 50th season overall and 46th in the National Football League. It ultimately became their final NFL season until 1999, their final season at Cleveland Stadium, and Bill Belichick's final year as Browns head coach. The team finished 5–11, fourth in the AFC Central, though most of the season was overshadowed by the Cleveland Browns relocation controversy. The team was documented in NFL Network's A Football Life.

After finishing 11–5 in 1994 and winning a playoff game for the first time since 1989, the Browns were favored by many to reach Cleveland's first ever Super Bowl. The Browns started by winning three of their first four games and were 4–4 halfway through the season. On November 6, the day after the Browns recorded their fifth loss, a 37–10 blowout against the Oilers, owner Art Modell announced that he intended to move the team to Baltimore at the end of the season. Stunned by this news, the team collapsed and only won one of their remaining seven games and Belichick was fired after the season.

As part of the agreement reached in February 1996 to allow Modell to move, the city of Cleveland was allowed to keep the Browns name, franchise history and all memorabilia and agreed to build a new stadium by 1999. In return, Modell was allowed to take the player contracts from the Browns, as well as the bulk of his organization, to Baltimore, but his franchise, later named the Baltimore Ravens, would be considered a 1996 expansion team. The NFL agreed that the Browns would be reactivated no later than 1999, by way of an expansion draft or relocated team.

Offseason

NFL draft

Draft trades made 
 Traded Eric Metcalf and 1x26 to Atlanta Falcons for pick 1x10
 Traded 1x10 to San Francisco 49ers for 1x30, 3x94, 4x119, and 1996 1st Rounder.
 Traded 4th Round pick to Jacksonville Jaguars for 5x136 and 1996 6th Rounder.
 Traded 4x119 to Philadelphia Eagles for 5x147 and 1996 5th Rounder.
 Traded 7th Round pick to New England Patriots for 7x231.

Personnel

Staff

Roster

Regular season

Schedule 
The Browns' record was 4–5 on November 6, the day that owner Art Modell announced the team would be moving to Baltimore, Maryland for the 1996 season. Cleveland ended the season losing six of their final seven games.

The Browns became the first NFL team to be swept by an expansion team, losing twice to the Jacksonville Jaguars.

Note: Intra-division opponents are in bold text.

Season summary

Week 16 vs. Cincinnati Bengals 

The game marked the final game at Cleveland Stadium and the franchise's final game until 1999.

Standings

Relocation to Baltimore 

Modell announced on November 6, 1995, that he had signed a deal to relocate the Browns to Baltimore in 1996—a move which would return the NFL to Baltimore for the first time since the Baltimore Colts relocated to Indianapolis after the 1983 season. The very next day, on November 7, 1995, Cleveland voters overwhelmingly approved an issue that had been placed on the ballot at Modell's request, which provided $175 million through a 10-year extension of the existing sin tax to refurbish the outmoded and declining Cleveland Stadium.

After the move was announced, protests were held in Cleveland and even at Browns away games, and several lawsuits were filed, including a breach of contract by the city, which would have required the Browns to remain at the stadium until the end of the 1998 season. A compromise was reached in early February 1996. Modell was granted permission by the league to move the team, but only personnel. The Browns franchise, including its history, colors, logos, and other intellectual property, remained in Cleveland and the NFL officially regards the franchise as suspended for the 1996, 1997, and 1998 seasons. Modell's organization, later named the Baltimore Ravens, is officially regarded as a 1996 expansion team. The NFL agreed to revive the Browns no later than the 1999 season, by way of an expansion draft or another team relocating. The city of Cleveland agreed to drop its lawsuits and build a new stadium by 1999, funded by the sin tax passed to renovate Cleveland Stadium.

The old stadium was demolished in late 1996 and early 1997 and Cleveland Browns Stadium was built on the same site, opening in August 1999. While multiple teams threatened to move to Cleveland or were mentioned as considering it, the league chose in 1998 to return the team via an expansion draft and the team resumed play in 1999.

References

External links 
 1995 Cleveland Browns at Pro Football Reference (Profootballreference.com)
 1995 Cleveland Browns Statistics at jt-sw.com
 1995 Cleveland Browns Schedule at jt-sw.com
 1995 Cleveland Browns at DatabaseFootball.com  

Cleveland
Cleveland Browns seasons
Cleveland